Dipsas neuwiedi, Neuwied's tree snake, is a non-venomous snake found in Brazil.

References

Dipsas
Snakes of South America]
Endemic fauna of Brazil
Reptiles of Brazil
Reptiles described in 1911
Taxa named by Rodolpho von Ihering